is a Japanese football player who plays for Fukui United.

Club statistics
Updated to 23 February 2018.

References

External links

1984 births
Living people
Association football people from Shizuoka Prefecture
Japanese footballers
J2 League players
J3 League players
Japan Football League players
Singapore Premier League players
Albirex Niigata players
Albirex Niigata Singapore FC players
Gainare Tottori players
Azul Claro Numazu players
Association football defenders